The Kudar are an ethnographic group of the Iron people historically occupying Kudar Gorge, located in the northwest of Dzau district of South Ossetia.

They speak Kudaro-Dzau subdialect (one of the subdialects of the Iron dialect of the Ossetic language).

See also 
 Ossetians

References

Ossetian people
South Ossetia